The Nobel Foundation is a private institution founded on 29 June 1900 to manage the finances and administration of the Nobel Prizes. The foundation is based on the last will of Alfred Nobel, the inventor of dynamite.

It also holds Nobel Symposia on important breakthroughs in science and topics of cultural or social significance.

History 

Alfred Nobel (born 21 October 1833, in Stockholm, Sweden) was a chemist, engineer, innovator, armaments manufacturer and the inventor of dynamite. He owned Bofors, a major armaments manufacturer, which he had redirected from its original business as an iron and steel mill. Nobel held 355 different patents, dynamite being the most famous. Nobel amassed a sizeable personal fortune during his lifetime, thanks mostly to this invention. In 1896 Nobel died of a stroke in his villa in San Remo, Italy where he had lived his final years.

Nobel's will expressed a request, to the surprise of many, that his money be used for prizes in physics, chemistry, peace, physiology or medicine and literature. Though Nobel wrote several wills during his lifetime, the last was written a little over a year before he died, and signed at the Swedish-Norwegian Club in Paris on 27 November 1895. Nobel bequeathed 94% of his total assets, 31 million Swedish kronor, to establish and endow the five Nobel Prizes. (As of 2008 that equates to 186 million US dollars.)

The executors of his will were Ragnar Sohlman and Rudolf Lilljequist who formed the Nobel Foundation to take care of Nobel's fortune and organize the prizes. Although Nobel's will established the prizes, his plan was incomplete and, because of various other hurdles, it took five years before the Nobel Foundation could be established and the first prizes could be awarded on 10 December 1901 to, among others, Wilhelm Conrad Röntgen. As of 31 December 2020, the assets controlled by the Nobel Foundation amounted to 5.176 billion Swedish kronor (approx. US$631.61 million as of 31 December 2020).

The Nobel Foundation 

The Nobel Foundation was founded as a private organisation on 29 June 1900 specifically to manage the finances and administration of the Nobel Prizes. It is based on Nobel's last will and testament. At the time Nobel's will led to much skepticism and criticism and thus it was not until 26 April 1897 that his will was approved by the Storting. Soon thereafter they appointed the members of the Norwegian Nobel Committee that was to award the Peace Prize. Shortly after, the other prize-awarding organizations followed; Karolinska Institutet on 7 June, the Swedish Academy on 9 June and the Royal Swedish Academy of Sciences on 11 June. The next thing the Nobel Foundation did was to try to agree on guidelines for how the Nobel Prize should be awarded. In 1900 the Nobel Foundation's newly created statutes were promulgated by King Oscar II.

In 1905 the Union between Sweden and Norway was dissolved which meant the responsibility for awarding Nobel Prizes was split between the two countries. Norway's Nobel Committee became the awarder of the Peace Prize while Sweden became the awarder of the other prizes.

In accordance with Nobel's will, the primary task of the Nobel Foundation is to manage the fortune Nobel left after him in a fund. Another important task of the Nobel Foundation is to represent the Nobel Prize to the outside world and to take charge of informal activities and issues related to the awarding of the Nobel Prizes. The Nobel Foundation is not involved in any way in the process of selecting the Nobel laureates. In many ways the Nobel Foundation is similar to an investment company in that it invests money in various ways to create a solid funding base for the prize and the administrative activities. The Nobel Foundation is exempt from all taxes in Sweden (since 1946) and from investment taxes in the United States (since 1953). Since the 1980s the foundation's investments began to earn more money than previously. At the beginning of the 1980s the award money was 1 million SEK but in 2008 the award money had increased to 10 million SEK.

According to the statutes the foundation should consist of a Board with its seat in Stockholm. It should consist of five men. The Chairman of the board should be appointed by the King in Council. The other four members should be appointed by the trustees of the prize-awarding institutions. The Board's first task was to choose an executive director from among the board members. A deputy director should be appointed by the King in Council and two deputies for the other members were appointed by the Trustees. Since 1995 all members of the board have been chosen by the trustees and the executive director and the deputy director appointed by the board itself.

Apart from the board, the Nobel Foundation is made up by the prize-awarding institutions (the Royal Swedish Academy of Sciences, the Nobel Assembly, the Swedish Academy and the Norwegian Nobel Committee), the trustees of the prize-awarding institutions and auditors.

Nobel Symposia 
In 1965, the foundation initiated the Nobel Symposia, a program that holds symposia "devoted to areas of science where breakthroughs around the world are occurring or deal with other topics of primary cultural or social significance." The symposia has covered topics such as prostaglandins, chemical kinetics, diabetes mellitus, string theory, cosmology, and the Cold War in the 1980s. The Nobel Symposium Committee consists of members from the Nobel Committees in Chemistry, Literature, Peace, Physics, and Physiology or Medicine; the Prize Committee for Economics; the Bank of Sweden Tercentenary Foundation; and the Wallenberg Foundation.

Other Nobel prizes announced by members of the Nobel family 
In 2007, the Nobel Charitable Trust, founded by Michael Nobel, Gustaf Nobel, Peter Nobel, and Philip Nobel, announced their plans to establish a new Nobel prize, the Michael Nobel Energy Award, that will award innovations in alternative energy technology. It will be the first new Nobel prize established by the Nobel family since Alfred Nobel established his prizes. However, it will be awarded by the Nobel Charitable Trust and not by the Nobel Foundation, although both are organisations founded by the Nobel family.

The plan was announced at nanoTX 07. The Nobel Foundation quickly reacted by threatening legal action for "clear misuse of the reputation and goodwill of the Nobel Prize and the associations of integrity and eminence that has been created over time and through the efforts of the Nobel Committees". The director, Michael Sohlman, of the Nobel Foundation and the elected head of the Nobel family disapproved to the institution of the so-called 'Dr. Michael Nobel Award' as well as the Nobel Charitable Trust (NCT) and Nobel Family Benevolent society.

See also
 Lars Ernster (1920–1998) – a professor of biochemistry and a former member of the Board of the Nobel Foundation
 Ragnar Sohlman
 List of wealthiest foundations
 Nobel Conference

Notes

External links 
 
 "2007 Nobel Conference" – Official site of the "2007 Nobel Conference" at Gustavus Adolphus College, Saint Peter, Minnesota. Retrieved 28 October,
 "The Nobel Foundation" – Official site of the Nobel Foundation.
 "Nobel Symposia" – Official webpage of the Nobel Foundation.
 "The Will of Alfred Nobel" – Official webpage of the Nobel Foundation; quotes a pertinent excerpt.

Nobel Prize
Foundations based in Sweden